Joan Nestle (born May 12, 1940) is a Lambda Award winning writer and editor and a founder of the Lesbian Herstory Archives, which holds, among other things, everything she has ever written. She is openly lesbian and sees her work of archiving history as critical to her identity as "a woman, as a lesbian, and as a Jew".

Life
"As a woman, as a lesbian, as a Jew, I know that much of what I call history others will not. But answering that challenge of exclusion is the work of a lifetime." (From A Restricted Country). "I wrote these words in 1986 and though historical attentions have shifted somewhat since then, they still embody my dedication to creating a more inclusive story of women and Jews. I am now 65, living in a conservative America, in a world torn by war, by such desperate needs for safety that difference is a fearful thing. More than ever, I believe in a feminism that does not run from the full complexity of women's lives, from the vital differences between us as well as the connections that bind us. A Jewish women's history that seeks respectability at the price of our full story will disinherit some of our most embattled women. The Lesbian Herstory Archives is a place of remembering, of refusal of historical exile, where as a Jew from working class roots and a femme feminist from the queer 1950s, I could help ensure that shame and assimilation did not win out over our wondrous complexities. The archives must be a home big enough for all of us.”

Nestle's father died before she was born, and she was raised by her widowed mother Regina Nestle, a bookkeeper in New York City's Garment District, whom she credits with inspiring her "belief in a woman's undeniable right to enjoy sex".  She attended Martin Van Buren High School in Queens and received her B.A. from Queens College, City University of New York in 1963.  During the mid-1960s she became involved in the Civil Rights Movement, traveling to the Southern United States to join the Selma to Montgomery march and to participate in voter registration drives. She earned a master's degree in English from New York University in 1968 and worked toward a doctorate for two years before returning to Queens College to teach.

Nestle had been part of the working-class, butch and femme bar culture of New York City since the late 1950s.  In an interview with Ripe Magazine, she recalled that the center of her social life as a young lesbian was a bar called the Sea Colony, which, typically for the time, was run by organized crime and that, in an attempt to avoid raids by the vice squad, allowed only one woman into the bathroom at a time:

The bathroom line went from the back room through a narrow hallway to the front room to the toilet which was behind the bar. This butch woman would stand at the front of the line and we each got two wraps of toilet paper. ... It took me a long time to realize that while I was fighting for all these other causes, that it wasn't okay for me to get my allotted amount of toilet paper.

After the Stonewall riots in 1969, gay liberation became a focus of her activism.  She joined the Lesbian Liberation Committee in 1971 and helped found the Gay Academic Union (GAU) in 1972.  The following year, she and other members of the GAU began to gather and preserve documents and artifacts related to lesbian history. This project became the Lesbian Herstory Archives, which opened in 1974 in the pantry of the apartment she shared with her then-partner Deborah Edel, and later with her family housecleaner Mabel Hampton, and moved to a brownstone in Park Slope, Brooklyn in 1992. Today its holdings include more than 20,000 books, 12,000 photographs, and 1,600 periodical titles. It holds everything written by Nestle.

Nestle began writing fiction in 1978, when a prolonged illness prevented her from teaching for a year.  Her erotica focusing on butch and femme relationships made her a controversial figure during the feminist sex wars of the 1980s; members of Women Against Pornography called for censorship of her stories.  In her political writings, Nestle, a self-identified femme, argued that contemporary feminism, in rejecting butch and femme identities, was asking her to repress an important part of herself.  She said she "wanted people, especially lesbians, to see that the butch-femme relationship isn't just some negative heterosexual aping".  Her writings on the subject were highly influential; Lillian Faderman describes her as the "midwife" to a revised view of butch and femme, and her 1992 anthology The Persistent Desire: A Femme-Butch Reader became the standard work in its field.

She retired from Queens College, City University of New York in 1995 due to an illness that was eventually identified as colorectal cancer.  She was diagnosed with breast cancer in 2001.  She now lives in Australia with her partner Dianne Otto, the Francine V McNiff Professor in Human Rights Law at the University of Melbourne, and teaches at the University of Melbourne.

In 1992, Nestle delivered the first Kessler Lecture for the CUNY Center for Lesbian and Gay Studies titled "I Lift My Eyes to the Hill": the Life of Mabel Hampton as Told by a White Woman. Her life was the subject of a 2002 documentary by Joyce Warshow entitled Hand on the Pulse, and she appears in the 1994 documentary about lesbian history Not Just Passing Through.

Nestle is a longtime patron of the Australian Lesbian and Gay Archives.

Works

As writer

 A Fragile Union: New and Collected Writings (1998)
 A Restricted Country (1988)

As editor

 GENDERqUEER: Voices from Beyond the Binary (2002)—co-edited with Clare Howell and Riki Wilchins
 Best Lesbian Erotica 2000 (1999)—co-edited with Tristan Taormino
 The Vintage Book of International Lesbian Fiction (1999)—co-edited with Naomi Holoch
 Women on Women 3: An Anthology of Lesbian Short Fiction (1996)—co-edited with Naomi Holoch
 Sister and Brother: Lesbians and Gay Men Write about Their Lives Together (1994)—co-edited with John Preston
 Women on Women 2: An Anthology of Lesbian Short Fiction (1993)—co-edited with Naomi Holoch
 The Persistent Desire: A Femme-Butch Reader (1992)
 Women on Women 1: An Anthology of Lesbian Short Fiction (1990)—co-edited with Naomi Holoch
 Sinister Wisdom 94/Lesbians and Exile" (2014)-co-edited with Yasmin Tambiah

Awards
 2015 Trailblazer Award from the Golden Crown Literary Society for Lifetime Achievement
 2000 Lambda Literary Award for Best Lesbian & Gay Anthology—Fiction for The Vintage Book of International Lesbian Fiction 1999 Lambda Literary Award for Lesbian Studies for A Fragile Union 1997 Lambda Literary Award for Best Lesbian & Gay Anthology—Fiction for Women on Women 3 1996 Bill Whitehead Award for Lifetime Achievement
 1994 Lambda Literary Award for Best Lesbian and Gay Anthology-Nonfiction for Sister and Brother 1992 Lambda Literary Award for Best Lesbian Anthology for The Persistent Desire 1990 Lambda Literary Award for Best Lesbian Anthology for Women on Women 1 1988 American Library Association Gay/Lesbian Book Award for A Restricted Country''

References

External links
 Official website
 Lesbian Herstory Archives

1940 births
Butch and femme
New York University alumni
Jewish American writers
American lesbian writers
LGBT Jews
Lesbian working-class culture
LGBT people from New York (state)
Living people
Lambda Literary Award winners
Stonewall Book Award winners
Sex-positive feminists
Martin Van Buren High School alumni
Lesbian academics
21st-century American Jews
21st-century American women writers